The 1995 Cornell Big Red football team was an American football team that represented Cornell University during the 1995 NCAA Division I-AA football season. Cornell tied for second in the Ivy League. 

In its sixth season under head coach Jim Hofher, the team compiled a 6–4 record and outscored opponents 261 to 222. Greg Bloedorn, Doug Knopp and John Vitullo were the team captains. 

Cornell's 5–2 conference record tied for second in the Ivy League standings. The Big Red outscored Ivy opponents 203 to 159. 

Cornell played its home games at Schoellkopf Field in Ithaca, New York.

Schedule

References

Cornell
Cornell Big Red football seasons
Cornell Big Red football